A Redskin's Bravery is a 1911 American short silent Western film produced by the Bison Motion Pictures and New York Motion Picture Company. It was distributed by the Motion Picture Distributors and Sales Company.

This film is preserved in the Library of Congress collection.

Themes 
A Redskin's Bravery is an example of how Bison films were often faulted for trite stories and carelessly staged action.  It is also an example of a trend in the early 1900s to portray Native Americans as "the noble savage".

References

External links
 

1911 films
1911 Western (genre) films
1911 short films
American black-and-white films
American silent short films
Silent American Western (genre) films
1910s American films
1910s English-language films